Barkha Bisht Sengupta is an Indian Television and Film Actress. She works in Hindi TV serials and Bengali, Hindi Movies. Barkha Bisht made her first TV appearance in Kitni Mast Hai Zindagi as Udita. She made her screen debut in Hindi Film Raajneeti (2010) and Bengali film debut in Dui Prithibi (2010). Barkha Bisht is married to actor Indraneil Sengupta in 2007.

Personal life 

Barkha spent her childhood in military towns specially in Kolkata, as her father was a colonel. She is a Garhwali and originally belongs to Dehradun in Uttarakhand. She is the youngest of three sisters, the eldest being a hotel management professional and the elder a fashion designer. She was very popular amongst her childhood friends, especially in Kendriya Vidyalaya, Fort William, Kolkata. She was also voted as the NDA Queen, in December 2000, where she was escorted by her old friend, S.Ganguly. She is married to Indraneil Sengupta, her fellow actor and co-star from Pyaar Ke Do Naam: Ek Raadha, Ek Shyaam and Doli Saja Ke and a film based in lockdown titled Choices. The couple tied the knot on 2 March 2008 in Haridwar after a two-year courtship.

In October 2011, she gave birth to a baby girl named Meira. Barkha and Indraneil were separated in 2021.

After Separation From Indraneil reportedly She found love again back in 2022.She is currently dating Saath Nibhana Saathiya Actor Ashish Sharma.

Career 
She started her career on television with a show called Kitni Mast Hai Zindagi, aired on MTV India. This was followed by a show on StarPlus called Pyaar Ke Do Naam: Ek Raadha, Ek Shyaam, where she played the lead roles of Shyaama, Raadha and Radhika. She has also hosted a film-news based programme called Popkorn on Zoom TV. She has played the lead role of Anupama in Doli Saja Ke on Sahara One channel. She also played cameo roles on the shows Kasautii Zindagii Kay, Kyaa Hoga Nimmo Kaa and Kkavyanjali. She participated in a reality show called Saas v/s Bahu. Her next performance was the central character Dhani in Sajan Ghar Jaana Hai. She then played the character of Hanuman's mother Añjanā on the show Sankat Mochan Mahabali Hanumaan on Sony TV, and also played the lead role of Prema Shalini on SAB TV's Shrimaan Shrimati Phir Se. She has also played the role of Bhairavi in Kaal Bhairav Rahasya Season 2. She also acted in the serials Chandragupta Maurya and Paramavatar Shri Krishna by playing the roles of Tarini, the wife of Dhana Nanda and Draupadi respectively. She also played role of Nandini in star plus's Shaadi Mubarak.

Filmography

Film

Television

Web series

References

External links 
 

Actresses from Haryana
Indian television actresses
Living people
Kendriya Vidyalaya alumni
People from Hisar (city)
Actresses in Hindi cinema
Actors from Mumbai
Year of birth missing (living people)